Zoff is a surname. Notable people with the surname include:

Alfred Zoff (1852–1927), Austrian painter
Dino Zoff (born 1942), Italian football player
Marianne Zoff (1893–1984), Austrian actress and opera singer
Otto Zoff (1890–1963), Austrian journalist and author
Stefano Zoff (born 1966), Italian boxer